This article lists different types of pump and provides a comparison of certain key design features. Different types of pumps are suitable for different applications, for example: a pump's maximum lift height also determines the applications it can be used for. Low-lift pumps are only suitable for the pumping of surface water (e.g., irrigation, drainage of lands, ...), while high-lift pumps allow deep water pumping (e.g., potable water pumping from wells).

Direct lift devices

Displacement pumps

Velocity pumps

Buoyancy pumps

Impulse Pumps

Note:  reciprocating pumps are cyclic, rotary pumps are typically continuous.

References

Technological comparisons